Talinda Nyathi (born 4 August 1978) is a Botswanan footballer who currently plays as a defender for ECCO City Green. He played for the Botswana national football team in 2004.

External links

Association football defenders
Botswana footballers
Botswana international footballers
1978 births
Living people
Notwane F.C. players
ECCO City Green players